Greece competed at the 2011 World Aquatics Championships in Shanghai, China between July 16 and 31, 2011.

Medalists

Diving

Greece has qualified 5 athletes in diving.

Men

Women

Open water swimming

Men

Women

Mixed

Swimming

Greece qualified 8 swimmers.

Men

Women

Synchronised swimming

Greece has qualified 2 athletes in synchronised swimming.

Women

Water polo

Women

Team Roster

Eleni Kouvdou
Christina Chrysoula Tsoukala
Antiopi Melidoni
Ilektra Maria Psouni
Kyriaki Liosi
Alkisti Avramidou
Alexandra Asimaki
Antigoni Roumpesi
Angeliki Gerolymou
Triantafyllia Manolioudaki
Stavroula Antonakou
Georgia Lara
Eleni Goula

Group C

Quarterfinals

Semifinals

Gold medal game

References

Nations at the 2011 World Aquatics Championships
2011 in Greek sport
Greece at the World Aquatics Championships